This article shows results of South Korean football clubs in the AFC Champions League. South Korea's K League became the most successful league in the AFC Champions League by winning the most titles with twelve despite absenting itself from the competition for eight years from 1986 to 1993–94 season.

Statistics

Titles by club

Comprehensive results
: Champions
: Runners-up
: Third place : Semi-finals
: Fourth place
QF: Quarter-finals R16: Round of 16
GS: Group stage
PO: Qualifying play-offs

Asian Champion Club Tournament

Asian Club Championship

AFC Champions League

!Part
!width="1" rowspan="13"|
|- align=center
|align=left|Jeonbuk Hyundai Motors || 15 
|- align=center
|align=left| Suwon Samsung Bluewings || 10 
|- align=center
|align=left| Ulsan Hyundai || 10 
|- align=center
|align=left| FC Seoul || 8 
|- align=center
|align=left| Pohang Steelers || 8 
|- align=center
|align=left| Seongnam FC || 6 
|- align=center
|align=left| Jeju United || 3 
|- align=center
|align=left| Daegu FC || 3 
|- align=center
|align=left| Jeonnam Dragons || 3 
|- align=center
|align=left| Busan IPark || 1 
|- align=center
|align=left| Daejeon Hana Citizen || 1 
|- align=center
|align=left| Gyeongnam FC || 1 

|-
! 2002–03
! 2004
! 2005
! 2006
! 2007
! 2008
! 2009
! 2010
! 2011
! 2012
! 2013
! 2014
! 2015
! 2016
! 2017
! 2018
! 2019
! 2020
! 2021
! 2022
|- align=center
| || style="background:#c96;"|SF || || style="background:gold;"|1st || QF || || || QF || style="background:silver;" |2nd || GS || R16 || R16 || QF  || style="background:gold;"|1st || || QF || R16 || GS || QF || style="background:#c96;"|SF
|- align=center
| || || GS || || || || R16 || QF || style="background:#c96;" |SF || || GS  || || R16 || GS || GS || style="background:#c96;" |SF || || QF || ||
|- align=center
| || || || style="background:#c96;"|SF || || || GS || || || style="background:gold;"|1st || || GS || || || GS || R16 || R16 || style="background:gold;" |1st || style="background:#c96;"|SF || GS
|- align=center
| || || || || || || QF || || QF || || style="background:silver;"|2nd || style="background:#c96;" |SF || R16 || style="background:#c96;" |SF || GS || || || GS || ||
|- align=center
| || || || || || GS || style="background:gold;" |1st || QF || || GS || GS || QF || || GS || || || || || style="background:silver;"|RU ||
|- align=center
| GS || style="background:silver;" |2nd || || || style="background:#c96;"|SF || || || style="background:gold;"|1st || || R16 || || || R16 || || || || || || ||
|- align=center
| || || || || || || || || GS || || || || || || R16 || GS || || || ||
|- align=center
| || || || || || || || || || || || || || || || || GS || || R16 || R16
|- align=center
| || || || || GS || GS || || || || || || || || || || || || || || GS
|- align=center
| || || style="background:#c96;"|SF || || || || || || || || || || || || || || || || ||
|- align=center
| GS || || || || || || || || || || || || || || || || || || ||
|- align=center
| || || || || || || || || || || || || || || || || GS || || ||

Awards

Most Valuable Player

Top goalscorer

Fair Play Award

Details by club

Busan IPark

Daegu FC

Daejeon Citizen

FC Seoul

Gyeongnam FC

Jeju United

Jeonbuk Hyundai Motors

Jeonnam Dragons

Korea Tungsten

Pohang Steelers

Seongnam FC

ROK Army

Suwon Samsung Bluewings

Ulsan Hyundai

Yangzee

See also
K League

References

External links
 AFC Champions League Official website
 AFC Champions League on RSSSF

2002
Football clubs in South Korea
South Korean football club records and statistics
Football clubs in the AFC Champions League